Zakeri (also Romanized as Zākerī; also known as Zāker) is a village in Fathabad Rural District, in the Central District of Baft County, Kerman Province, Iran. At the 2006 census, its population was 41, in 8 families.

References 

Populated places in Baft County